José Francisco Cevallos Enríquez (born 18 January 1995) is an Ecuadorian footballer who plays currently as an attacking midfielder for club C.S. Emelec on loan from K.S.C. Lokeren Oost-Vlaanderen. He made his debut for Ecuador on 22 February 2017 in a match against the Honduras and scored the final goal in a 3–1 win.

In a recent poll Cevallos was elected the most promising Ecuadorian footballer to emerge from L.D.U. Quito.

Club career
In January 2013, Cevallos signed a loan deal with Juventus, for two seasons with an option to buy. In July 2014, however, having not played a single professional game for Juventus, Cevallos left the club to return to Ecuador. Cevallos did play in around 14 unofficial matches for Juventus at youth levels or in unofficial friendlies.

On 30 January 2018, Cevallos Jr. signed a contract for 4,5 years at Belgian side KSC Lokeren. The transfer fee is estimated around 1.2 million dollars (1 million euro's). Cevallos Jr. turned down several local offers. Even an offer from Club Atletico Independiente. (C.A.I.). Cevallos Jr. preferred to develop his skills in Europe.

International career
Cevallos made his international debut on 22 February 2017 against Honduras. Cevallos came on as a substitute with 21 minutes to go and also scored the last goal of the match in the 82 minute.

International goals
Scores and results list Ecuador's goal tally first.

Personal life
Cevallos is the son of Ecuadorian goalkeeper José Francisco Cevallos, who made 89 appearances for the national team and played at the 2002 FIFA World Cup.

Aside from his well known father, Cevallos' family includes his mother Rossi Enríquez, his older brother Francisco Andrés (born 1994) and his younger brothers José Gabriel (born 2000) and Matias (born 2011).

References

1995 births
Living people
Ecuadorian footballers
Ecuadorian expatriate footballers
Ecuador international footballers
Ecuador youth international footballers
Ecuador under-20 international footballers
People from Guayaquil
Ecuadorian Serie A players
Belgian Pro League players
Challenger Pro League players
Primeira Liga players
L.D.U. Quito footballers
Juventus F.C. players
K.S.C. Lokeren Oost-Vlaanderen players
Portimonense S.C. players
C.S. Emelec footballers
Ecuadorian expatriate sportspeople in Italy
Ecuadorian expatriate sportspeople in Belgium
Ecuadorian expatriate sportspeople in Portugal
Expatriate footballers in Italy
Expatriate footballers in Belgium
Expatriate footballers in Portugal
Association football midfielders